Syllitus chilensis is a species of beetle in the family Cerambycidae. It was described by Cerda in 1953.

References

Stenoderini
Beetles described in 1953